TeamFourStar is a YouTube channel and production company most notable for the creation of the Dragon Ball Z Abridged web series, a parody of the iconic anime television series Dragon Ball Z. Noted for its satirical humor of various story elements from the original anime, the series became popular online and garnered praise from both fans and critics alike. However, in 2020, the group decided to end the series after producing episodes for 11 years.

Career 
TeamFourStar was created in 2008 by members Scott "KaiserNeko" Frerichs, Nick "Lanipator" Landis, and Curtis "Takahata101" Arnott. That same year, they created the Dragon Ball Z Abridged series, a non-profit parody abridged series consisting of footage from the titular Dragon Ball Z anime interspersed with humor. The abridged series satirized various story aspects of the Dragon Ball Z universe, such as the power level system and the "over 9000" meme, the appearance of character Broly in the movie Broly: The Legendary Super Saiyan, and the general dialogue and humor of the original series. Since its creation in 2008, the series garnered online popularity as many of the episodes accumulated millions of views.

In 2014, TeamFourStar's channel was listed amongst the Google Preferred program.
Despite this, their channel dealt with copyright issues due to their usage of Dragon Ball Z footage, with Toei Animation offering them numerous copyright strikes as a protective measure for their properties. These copyright issues led to the channel temporarily removing the Dragon Ball Z Abridged series on YouTube along with their channel briefly going offline, and was one of the main factors for the ending of the series.

Ending of Dragon Ball Z Abridged
In 2018, TeamFourStar released episode 60 of Dragon Ball Z Abridged after the series went on a year of hiatus, ending on episode 59 with a cliffhanger. The channel initially promised a fourth season that would focus on the Buu Saga, the final arc of the original anime. However, in 2020, TeamFourStar decided to end the series, citing a loss of passion as well as the changing climate of YouTube in regards to copyright.

Gaming outlet Kotaku cited a Patreon post from Scott Frerichs that read:

Reception
TeamFourStar's Dragon Ball Z Abridged series has received acclaim from both critics and fans alike, many of them extolling it for both its faithfulness to the original anime and its satirical depiction of the series' different tropes. Joe Ballard from CBR praised the abridged parody for its combination of humor surrounding the characters along with its sense of realism, stating that "where Dragon Ball Abridged really shines is with its ability to balance its humor with an added sense of awareness and realism that doesn't really appear in the original series." Writing for pop culture outlet The Mary Sue, assistant editor Princess Weekes gave praise to the series for its storytelling, voice acting and humor, stating that it "give(s) you the best crash course into the franchise by having a very character driven narrative with a lot of jokes and a real Rick & Morty sense of talking about the universe.” She went on to further elaborate that "DBZA is a labor of love, and you see that with every joke, the voice acting, and the time taken to make each edit work seamlessly into the next. It is a triumph of storytelling and modernizes the series for viewers today." Jake Draugelis from ClickOnDetroit remarked that the allure of the series derived from their retaining of "the spirit of the original anime intact as they parody it… The tendency  for other abridged series is to lose their heart on the path to funniness, but the good folks at Team Four Star have gotten so good at voicing DBZ characters that they have been asked to do voice work in official DBZ properties."

Some outlets have even considered the abridged series to be superior to the original in various aspects. Nick Valdez from ComicBook asserted that the series "added the necessary layers the original Dragon Ball Z anime was missing.” He went on to commend the abridged series for its ability to take itself less seriously than the original series: "While fans were able to find the fun in all of the fights and frenetic animation, Abridged drops the pretense of the series' coolness and pokes fun at the series' more wild elements." In a listicle from CBR which compared the abridged series to the original, Brian Sheridan asserted that the series triumphed over the original in terms of its voice acting, character and plot development, and its dialogue and humor.

As of May 2022, TeamFourStar's channel has reached over 3.7 million subscribers and 1.7 billion views.

References

External links 
 
 
 

Comedy YouTubers
Parodies
YouTube channels launched in 2008